The Sydney Review of Books is an online literary magazine established in 2013.

According to the journal's editor James Ley it was created to address shortcomings in Australian book reviews.

Awards 
In 2019 SRB contributor Fiona Kelly McGregor won the Woollahra Digital Literary Award for Non-Fiction for her essay on Kathleen Mary Fallon's 'Working Hot'. 
In 2019 SRB contributor Jeff Sparrow won the Walkley-Pascall Award for Arts Criticism for his review essay of Behrouz Boochani's No Friend But The Mountains. In 2018 SRB contributor Delia Falconer won this award for an essay on writing and extinction entitled 'The Opposite of Glamour'.

Funding 
The journal is funded by Western Sydney University's Writing and Society Research Centre, the Australia Council, Create NSW, the Copyright Agency, Creative Victoria, Arts Queensland, Arts Tasmania, City of Sydney and Parramatta City.

References

External links

2013 establishments in Australia
Literary magazines published in Australia
Book review magazines
Magazines established in 2013
Magazines published in Sydney
Online literary magazines